Radivoj Radić (22 January 1954, Livno, today Bosnia and Herzegovina) is a Serbian historian, specialist for Byzantine studies.

Selected works
 Oblasni gospodari u Vizantiji krajem 12. i u prvim decenijama 13. veka, ZRVI 24—25. (1986), 151—290.
 Vreme Jovana V Paleologa (1332—1391), Belgrade 1993.
 Strah u poznoj Vizantiji 1180—1453, I — II, Belgrade 2000.
 Iz Carigrada u srpske zemlje, Studije iz vizantijske i srpske istorije, Belgrade 2003.
 Srbi pre Adama i posle njega, Istorija jedne zloupotrebe: Slovo protiv „novoromantičara“, Belgrade 2005. (second edition).
 Vizantija, purpur i pergament, Belgrade 2006.
 Carigrad, priče sa Bosfora, Belgrade 2007.
 Vizantija i Srbija,Belgrade 2010
 Konstantin Veliki, nadmoć hrišćanstva,Belgrade 2010.
 Romejski svet - kratka istorija svakodnevnog života u Vizantiji,Belgrade 2012.
 Stari Sloveni,Belgrade 2011.
 Srednjovekovni putovođa, Belgrade 2011.
 Strah u poznoj Vizantiji 1180—1453,Belgrade 2014.
 Drugo lice Vizantije, Belgrade 2014.

References

1954 births
Living people
People from Livno
Serbs of Bosnia and Herzegovina
Serbian Byzantinists
20th-century Serbian historians
Academic staff of the University of Niš

Scholars of Byzantine history
21st-century Serbian historians